Cherelle L. Parker (born 1973) is an American politician who is a former Democratic member of the City Council of Philadelphia, Pennsylvania, representing the Ninth District. She was elected on November 3, 2015, in the general election. Previously, she served as a Democratic member of the Pennsylvania House of Representatives, representing the 200th District from 2005 until 2015.

She is a candidate in the Democratic primary in the 2023 Philadelphia mayoral election.

Early life 
Parker grew up in a neighborhood in Northwest Philadelphia, raised by her mother; she never knew her father. When she was 11, her mother died and she was raised by her grandparents, who were both from the rural south. Her grandmother died when she was 16, which left only her grandfather, a disabled Navy veteran, to raise her. In 1990 Parker won a high school speaking contest put on by council member Augusta Clark, which earned her the chance to give her speech in front of City Council, as well as a cash prize and a trip to Africa. While still in high school, she interned for council member Marian Tasco.

Parker studied at Lincoln University and earned a Master of Science in Education. Her first job was as a high school English teacher. Marian Tesco asked Parker to join her city hall office in 1995, and she worked there for ten years, filling a variety of roles.

Political career

In 2005, she ran in a special election for state representative to fill the spot left open by LeAnna Washington, and won. She remained in that office for ten years, five of which she was chair of the Philadelphia Delegation. Her accomplishments in the Pennsylvania House of Representatives include the "Philadelphia Tax Fairness Package", a special cigarette tax, and the 2012 Act 75, which amended state law to allow expert testimony in sexual assault cases.

When Tasco retired from City Council in 2015, the Democratic Party chose Parker to run as her replacement, and she won. During her time in City Council, she has led the passage of the "Philly First Home" program.

In February 2021, Parker was elected to the chair of the board for the Delaware River Port Authority.

Personal life

Parker is a wife and mother residing in the Mt. Airy section of Philadelphia. 

In 2015, Parker lost her appeal of a drunk driving conviction and began serving her sentence of three days in jail, a $1000 fine, and a 1-year license suspension.

See also
List of members of Philadelphia City Council since 1952

References

External links
Pennsylvania House of Representatives - Cherelle L. Parker official PA House website
Project Vote Smart - Representative Cherelle L. Parker (PA) profile
Follow the Money - Cherelle Parker
2006 campaign contributions
Pennsylvania House Democratic Caucus - Rep. Cherelle L. Parker official Party website

Members of the Pennsylvania House of Representatives
Philadelphia City Council members
1973 births
Living people
Women state legislators in Pennsylvania
Pennsylvania politicians convicted of crimes
African-American state legislators in Pennsylvania
African-American women in politics
Women city councillors in Pennsylvania
21st-century American politicians
21st-century American women politicians
African-American city council members in Pennsylvania
21st-century African-American women
21st-century African-American politicians
20th-century African-American people
20th-century African-American women